Air car may refer to:
Air Car (hovercraft), a hovercraft
Air car, a car powered by an air engine